Octavia is a feminine given name of Latin origin meaning eight that derives from the Octavia  gens. It has seen steady use in the United States, where it has ranked among the one thousand most popular names for girls between 1880 and 1937 and then again at different times between 1971 and 1999 and between 2017 and 2021. It was the 248th most popular name for American girls in 2021, more popular than at any other time.

References 

Latin feminine given names